PReVENT is a European automotive industry activity co-funded by the European Commission to contribute to road safety by developing and demonstrating preventive safety applications and technologies.

Overview
Preventive and active safety applications help drivers to avoid or mitigate accidents by using in-vehicle systems that sense the nature and significance of the danger, while taking the driver's state into account.

The PReVENT project is one of the largest initiative on road safety co-funded as an Integrated Project  by the European Commission. The total budget amounts to more than €55 million for a duration of 4 years starting from February 2004 to January 2008. It involves more than 50 European partners from the most prominent vehicle manufacturers and equipment suppliers (Tiers1) to the best intelligent vehicle research laboratories in Europe.

Three general concepts have been followed throughout the PReVENT Integrated Project:
The Virtual Safety Belt, the Time-To-Collision timescale and Three-layer architecture.

The Virtual Safety Belt is the concept of integrating complementary safety functions in one vehicle. PReVENT partners have worked together to develop the virtual safety belt around the vehicle by:

 developing a set of affordable, easy to deploy and complementary safety functions
 using an integrated approach to increase system capabilities and achieve maximum benefit 
The virtual safety belt helps drivers to:
 maintain a safe speed 
 keep a safe distance 
 drive within the lane 
 avoid overtaking in critical situations 
 safely pass intersections 
 avoid crashes with vulnerable road users
 and last but not least, reduce the severity of an accident if it still occurs.

The Time-To-Collision concept is a time scale of events preceding and following a crash or a critical situation. The safety function designers are using this timescale in order to create and harmonised progression of interventions and integration of preventive, active and passive safety. Depending on the significance and timing of the threat, the active and preventive safety systems will:

 inform the driver as early as possible 
 warn him or her if there is no driver reaction to the information, and 
 actively assist or ultimately intervene in order to avoid an accident or mitigate its consequences.

The three layer architecture for intelligent vehicles, namely Perception-Decision-Action, is an application integration concept. The Perception layer fuses together the information from the vehicle sensors in order to bring better and more reliable perception of the environment. It then passes this information to a decision layer which centralises and keeps track of all potential threats around the vehicle. Finally, the Action layer receives a decision information and judges by itself how and when to trigger an information, warning or intervention for the driver. This simplified concept helps the design of intelligent vehicles by using one single reliable and precise source of perception of the environment including the vehicle itself and avoid multiple alerts or conflicting messages displayed to the driver.

A major display of the results of the PReVENT project took place in September 2007 together with the i2010: Intelligent Car Initiative 2007 event and the eSafety Forum.

See also
Intelligent car
Smart car

References 
 PReVENT Webpage
 European Commission's i2010's Intelligent car initiative
European Commission's eSafety information
 eSafety Office

PReVENT